"Nothing Really Matters" is a song by Dutch recording artist Mr. Probz. It was released on 29 September 2014 as a digital download. The song was written by Dennis Princewell Stehr, Aliaune Thiam, Giorgio Tuinfort and Jake Gosling. It peaked to number one on the Dutch Singles Chart and in Portugal. The song has also charted in Belgium and Sweden.

Music video
A music video to accompany the release of "Nothing Really Matters" was first released onto YouTube on 21 November 2014 at a total length of three minutes and forty-nine seconds. The Afrojack Remix video was released on June 2, 2015.

Track listing

Charts

Weekly charts

Year-end charts

Release history

Certifications

References

2014 singles
2014 songs
Mr Probz songs
Songs written by Akon
Songs written by Giorgio Tuinfort
Songs written by Jake Gosling
Dutch Top 40 number-one singles
Ultra Music singles
Contemporary R&B ballads